The Aotearoa NZ Youth Party or Aotearoa NZ Youth Independence Party was an unregistered political party in New Zealand.  The party was the vehicle of "professional stirrer" Robert Terry of Reefton, who has contested elections on and off since 1998. Terry has received convictions for assault, bomb threats, and multiple threats to behead people.

In each election that the party contested, it was not eligible for the party vote and only stood one candidate, Terry, for an electorate seat. Terry first contested the 1998 Taranaki-King Country by-election, winning 10 votes. In the 2002 election Terry stood for the electorate of West Coast-Tasman, winning 136 votes. The party did not run in 2005, but Terry ran in West Coast-Tasman again in 2008, receiving 50 votes,  and in 2011, winning 52 votes. The party did not stand any candidates at the 2014 election.

References

Political parties in New Zealand